This is a list of games for the PlayStation 5. Physical games are sold on Ultra HD Blu-ray and digital games can be purchased through the PlayStation Store. The PlayStation 5 is backwards compatible with all but six PlayStation 4 games. This list only includes games that are released natively for PlayStation 5. PlayStation VR2 and backwards compatible games are excluded.
There are currently  games on this list.

Notes

References

Games
 
5 games
PlayStation 5